The England cricket team have appeared in every edition of the Cricket World Cup to date, being crowned champions in 2019. In addition, they were losing finalists in 1979, 1987 and 1992. England have been eliminated from the tournament in the group stage on four occasions (1999, 2003, 2007 and 2015).

England were the inaugural hosts of the World Cup, holding the first ever tournament in 1975. The country has since hosted the tournament a further four times; in 1979, 1983, 1999 and 2019, the most of any other country.

Cricket World Cup performances

*The win percentage excludes no results and counts ties as half a win.

1975 World Cup

The inaugural Cricket World Cup was hosted in 1975 by England, the only nation able to put forward the resources to stage an event of such magnitude at the time, The matches consisted of 60 six-ball overs per team, played during the daytime in traditional form, with the players wearing cricket whites and using red cricket balls. England won all their group stage matches but lost in their semi-final match against Australia.

In the semi-final, England were reduced to 37/7, as Gary Gilmour took 6/14, the best World Cup bowling figures at the time They were eventually bowled out for 93 in 36.2 overs. Australia initially suffered a collapse just as dramatic, falling to 39/6, before Gary Gilmour scored 28 from 28 balls, to help Australia to victory.

Scorecards

Squad 

 Mike Denness (c)
 Dennis Amiss
 Geoff Arnold
 Keith Fletcher
 Tony Greig
 Frank Hayes
 John Jameson (wk)
 Alan Knott (wk)
 Peter Lever
 Chris Old
 John Snow
 Derek Underwood
 Barry Wood

Source: Cricinfo 1975 World Cup stats for England

1979 World Cup

The 1979 Cricket World Cup was once again held in England. England won all of their group matches, and defeated New Zealand in a close semi-final by 9 runs. In the final, they lost to the West Indies.

In the semi-final, England began badly, falling to 38/2, before Mike Brearley (53 from 115 balls) and Graham Gooch (71 from 84 balls) resurrected the innings. Derek Randall (42 from 50 balls) scored quickly in the second half of the innings, and 25 runs from the last 3 overs of the innings saw England reach 221/8 from their 60 overs. In response, New Zealand reached 47 from 16 overs, before Bruce Edgar was out lbw. John Wright top-scored with 69 from 137 balls, before being run out. However, New Zealand continued to lose wickets, and they required 14 runs from the last over of the match, and England won by 9 runs, at the time the smallest winning margin by runs in World Cup matches.

In the final, the West Indies got off to a bad start, falling to 99/4. However, a "match winning performance" of 138 from 157 balls from Vivian Richards, and an aggressive innings from Collis King (86 from 66 balls) consolidated the innings with a 139 run partnership, as the West Indies scored 286/9 from 60 overs. In reply, the English openers, Mike Brearley (64 from 130 balls) and Geoff Boycott (57 from 105 balls), scored very slowly. They put together a very methodical opening partnership of 129 runs in 38 overs, but by the time both batsmen were out, the run rate had risen too high. Graham Gooch played some hefty strokes in scoring his 32, taking England to 183/2. However, the loss of Gooch triggered the biggest collapse in World Cup history, as England lost 8/11; Joel Garner took 5/3 in 11 balls. They were eventually all out for 194 in 51 overs.

Scorecards

Squad 

 Mike Brearley (c) & (wk)
 Ian Botham
 Geoffrey Boycott
 Phil Edmonds
 Mike Gatting
 Graham Gooch
 David Gower
 Mike Hendrick
 Wayne Larkins
 Geoff Miller
 Chris Old
 Derek Randall
 Bob Taylor (wk)
 Bob Willis

Source: Cricinfo 1979 World Cup stats for England

1983 World Cup

England were the host nation for the third consecutive tournament. They won 5 of their 6 group stage matches, losing against New Zealand, and qualified for the semi-final. In the semi-final, they were defeated by India "with great ease".

In the semi-final, England batted first, and reached 69 before losing opener Chris Tavaré. Medium pacer Mohinder Amarnath and off-spinner Kirti Azad helped slow the scoring rate, as England only managed 213 from their 60 overs. In reply, Yashpal Sharma (61 from 115 balls) and Sandeep Patil (51 from 32 balls) made half-centuries, and Amarnath and Yashpal's managed a 92 run partnership. India reached their target in 54.4 overs, winning the match by 6 wickets.

Scorecards

Squad 

Bob Willis (c)
Paul Allott
Ian Botham
Norman Cowans
Graham Dilley
Graeme Fowler (wk)
Mike Gatting
Ian Gould (wk)
David Gower
Trevor Jesty
Allan Lamb
Vic Marks
Derek Randall
Chris Tavaré

Source:

1987 World Cup

The 1987 Cricket World Cup was the first tournament not held in England. England matched their previous best performance, by reaching the final before losing to Australia.

In the semi-final, India chose to field first. After reaching 79/2, Graham Gooch (115 from 136 balls) and captain Mike Gatting (56 from 62 balls) shared a partnership of 117 runs in 19 overs. In the end, England reached 254/6 from their 50 overs. In reply, India made a bad start, and were 73/3. The middle order were more fluent, with Mohammed Azharuddin, (64 from 74 balls) top scoring. When Azharuddien was dismissed, India were 204/5 from 41 overs, and required 51 from 9 overs with 5 wickets in hand. However, they collapsed and were all out for 219 in 45.3 overs.

In the final, Australia won the toss and chose to bat. David Boon (75 from 125 balls, 7 fours) top-scored for Australia,  Helped by Mike Veletta (45 from 31 balls), Australia scored 65 runs from the last 6 overs of their innings, and posted 253/5 from their 50 overs. England opener Tim Robinson was out lbw for a first ball duck. Bill Athey (58 from 103 balls) top-scored, and England were almost on target. However, when captain Mike Gatting (41 from 45 balls) was out playing an attempted reverse sweep off the occasional off-spin bowling of Allan Border, this ended a growing partnership of 69 runs in 13 overs between him and Bill Athey. Allan Lamb's innings of 45 from 55 balls was insufficient, as the required run-rate for England began to rise, requiring 17 off the last over, and eventually losing by 7 runs.

Scorecards

Squad 

Mike Gatting (c)
Bill Athey
Chris Broad
Phillip DeFreitas
Paul Downton (wk)
John Emburey
Neil Foster
Graham Gooch
Eddie Hemmings
Allan Lamb
Derek Pringle
Tim Robinson
Gladstone Small

Source:

1992 World Cup

England reached their third World Cup final, and again lost in the final, this time to Pakistan. England won 5 of their 8 pool stage matches, with 1 no result, and easily qualified for the Semi-Final, despite a surprising lost to Zimbabwe in their final group match. Their semi-final was memorable due to a target recalculation under the most productive overs rule which removed any chance for South Africa to win the match. Despite being favourites to win the final, England lost to Pakistan, their third World Cup Final defeat.

The semi final between South Africa and England ended in controversial circumstances when, after a 10-minute rain delay, the most productive overs method revised South Africa's target from 22 runs from 13 balls to an impossible 21 runs from one ball. After the World Cup, ODIs used a different formula as a result of this incident, and it was eventually superseded by the Duckworth–Lewis method for the 1999 World Cup. According to the late Bill Frindall, had the Duckworth–Lewis method been applied at that rain interruption, the revised target would have been four runs to tie or five to win from the final ball.

England were favourites to win, having bowled out Pakistan for just 74 earlier in the tournament. A repeat looked possible when Derek Pringle dismissed both Pakistani openers, making the score 24/2. However, Imran Khan and Javed Miandad settled down to see off the new ball. A crucial moment occurred when Imran Khan was dropped by Graham Gooch at 9 runs. He later went on to score a match-winning 72. At the 25 over mark, Pakistan had only scored 70, but accelerated the score to 139 by the 31st over as Javed Miandad summoned a runner and Imran and him built a steady partnership. During his innings, Imran Khan hit a huge six off Richard Illingworth that landed far back into the members' section. Imran went on to score 72 and Miandad 58 to steady the innings, expectedly followed by an onslaught from Inzamam (42) and Wasim Akram (33) enabling Pakistan to give England a fighting target of 250. England's start was shaky. Ian Botham was dismissed for a duck by Wasim Akram, followed by Stewart, Hick and Gooch, which left England tumbling at 69/4. A solid partnership of 71 between Allan Lamb and Neil Fairbrother left Imran with no choice but to give an early second spell to his main pacer Wasim Akram in the 35th over. The decision wrote the fate of the match. Two magical deliveries from the great left-arm fast bowler showed Allan Lamb and the dangerous Chris Lewis the pavilion door. Soon Fairbrother was caught by Moin Khan off Aaqib Javed to seal England's last hope. When the cards were laid down, Captain Imran Khan had the last laugh when end man Richard Illingworth was caught by Ramiz Raja off his delivery to finish off the final and crown Pakistan World Cup winners.

Scorecards

Squad 

Graham Gooch (c)
Ian Botham
Phillip DeFreitas
Neil Fairbrother
Graeme Hick
Richard Illingworth
Allan Lamb
Chris Lewis
Derek Pringle
Dermot Reeve
Gladstone Small
Robin Smith
Alec Stewart (wk)
Phil Tufnell

Source:

1996 World Cup

England reached the Quarter-Finals of the 1996 Cricket World Cup, before being eliminated by Sri Lanka.

Scorecards

Squad 

Michael Atherton (c)
Dominic Cork
Phillip DeFreitas
Neil Fairbrother
Darren Gough
Graeme Hick
Peter Martin
Richard Illingworth
Jack Russell (wk)
Neil Smith
Robin Smith
Alec Stewart
Graham Thorpe
Craig White
Dermot Reeve

Source:

1999 World Cup

England hosted the 1999 Cricket World Cup, although some matches were played in Scotland, Ireland and the Netherlands. After defeats to South Africa and India, England failed to progress to the Knockout stage of the tournament, for the first time in the tournament history.

Scorecards

Squad 

  Alec Stewart (c/wk)
  Ian Austin
  Robert Croft
  Mark Ealham
  Neil Fairbrother
  Andrew Flintoff
  Angus Fraser
  Darren Gough
  Graeme Hick
  Adam Hollioake
  Nasser Hussain
  Nick Knight
  Alan Mullally
  Graham Thorpe
  Vince Wells

Source:

2003 World Cup

England forfeited their first match against Zimbabwe due to security concerns in Zimbabwe. Of the remaining 5 games, they won 3, but for the second consecutive World Cup, England failed to progress from the Group Stage.

Scorecards

Squads 

Nasser Hussain (c)
James Anderson
Ian Blackwell
Andrew Caddick
Paul Collingwood
Andrew Flintoff
Ashley Giles
Steve Harmison
Matthew Hoggard
Ronnie Irani
Nick Knight
Alec Stewart (wk)
Marcus Trescothick
Michael Vaughan
Craig White

Source:

2007 World Cup

After failing to progress from the Group Stage at the 1999 and 2003 World Cups, England managed to progress to the Super 8 stage of the tournament, by winning both their matches against Associate Nations. In the Super 8 stage, they were eliminated, beating Ireland, Bangladesh and West Indies but losing to 4 other Test-playing nations.

In their opening match, England lost Ed Joyce for a duck off the first legitimate delivery of the match, and only Paul Nixon and Liam Plunkett, the numbers eight and nine, managed a strike rate above 70. With the fall of Paul Collingwood at the end of 35th over, New Zealand captain Stephen Fleming brought on Shane Bond, and he removed Kevin Pietersen, England's top-scorer, and Andrew Flintoff in the same over. Jamie Dalrymple followed three overs later, as England had lost four wickets for five runs, but Nixon and Plunkett batted out the remaining 12 overs, making 71. In reply, New Zealand lost two wickets in eight balls to James Anderson and Liam Plunkett, and also had captain Fleming back for a single-figure score. However, from then on they made 191 for the loss of only one wicket, Craig McMillan caught off Monty Panesar's bowling. Scott Styris and Jacob Oram added an unbeaten 138 for the fifth wicket, just ten runs off the New Zealand record from the 1999 World Cup, resulting in a man-of-the-match award for Styris.

Their final match against Kenya was effectively a playoff match against the 2003 semi-finalists. Ed Joyce's second fifty in as many matches helped England qualify for the Super Eights. Steve Tikolo came in at four after James Anderson had removed both openers, and though he made his 20th half-century, none of his team-mates passed 20. Extras were the second-highest contributor, with six wides and eight no-balls, most of the latter coming from Sajid Mahmood and Andrew Flintoff, who bowled three no-balls each. Flintoff did get Tikolo out with a yorker, while three of Kenya's players were run out as they were bowled out on the last ball of the rain-reduced innings. Kenya's opening bowler Peter Ongondo extracted "tennis-ball bounce" to remove Michael Vaughan for one with the 19th ball of the game; however, despite Ian Bell getting caught for 16, England had reduced the equation to 126 off 34.2 overs after Joyce and Bell's partnership. With Kevin Pietersen also getting a fifty, England made it through with ten overs to spare.

In their first Super 8 match, England won the toss and batted first, but lost both openers to Boyd Rankin in six overs, before Ian Bell spent 74 balls making his 31. When Bell got out, the run rate was slightly above 4; in the final 28 overs, it was in excess of 6, with Paul Collingwood making 90, Kevin Pietersen 48 and Andrew Flintoff 43. Kyle McCallan was the most economical bowler for Ireland, and also took the wicket of Pietersen. Chasing 267 in reply, Niall O'Brien's third One-day International fifty and his second of the World Cup helped Ireland to a total of 139 for six in the 37th over, but despite faster than a run a ball scores from Trent Johnston and Andrew White Ireland fell 48 runs short as Andrew Flintoff took the final two wickets, though they exceeded their previous World Cup record total by seven runs.

Scorecards

Squad 

 Michael Vaughan (c)
 James Anderson
 Ian Bell
 Ravi Bopara
 Paul Collingwood
 Jamie Dalrymple
 Andrew Flintoff
 Ed Joyce
 Jon Lewis
 Sajid Mahmood
 Paul Nixon
 Monty Panesar
 Kevin Pietersen
 Liam Plunkett
 Andrew Strauss

Source:
Note: On 4 April 2007, Lewis was withdrawn from the squad for personal reasons. Stuart Broad replaced him.

2011 World Cup

In the group stages, England suffered shock losses to Ireland and Bangladesh. However, a victory against South Africa and a tie against eventual winners India helped England progress to the quarter-finals, where they lost to Sri Lanka.

England's opening match was against the Netherlands. Batting first, the Netherlands scored 292, the second highest score from an Associate nation playing against a Test nation, helped by a Ryan ten Doeschate century, and late innings acceleration to score 104 runs off the last ten overs of the innings. In reply, England started wrongly, reaching 100/0 at a run a ball, before losing Kevin Pietersen. England captain Andrew Strauss fell just short of a century, and all the England top order batsmen scored runs, with Paul Collingwood and Ravi Bopara taking England home with 1.2 overs to spare.

India batted first and opener Sachin Tendulkar scored his 47th ODI century and 5th World Cup century, the highest number of centuries by anyone ever in a World Cup. Support came from Gautam Gambhir and Yuvraj Singh who both made half-centuries. Tim Bresnan took his first five-wicket haul in ODI matches, which included three wickets with four balls in the 49th over. Chasing 339 to win, Andrew Strauss made his highest score in ODI cricket, with 158, before being dismissed by Zaheer Khan. Ian Bell survived an earlier LBW appeal, after it was referred via the DRS system. After a collapse from England, Graeme Swann scored one run off the final ball, tying the match.

Against Ireland, England batted first with Jonathan Trott top-scoring, with 92 from 92 balls. England batsmen Kevin Pietersen and Ian Bell also hit half-centuries, with Trott and Bell sharing a 177 run partnership. England finished on 327/8 from their 50 overs, having only scored 33 runs from their last 5 overs. In reply, Ireland lost their captain, William Porterfield in the very first ball, and were struggling at 111/5 after 25 overs. Kevin O'Brien came in with the score at 106/4, and made 113 in just 63 balls, including the fastest century in World Cup history, as Ireland won the match by 3 wickets, with five balls to spare. It was the largest successful run chase in Cricket World Cup history.

Against South Africa, England batted first and lost the wickets of Andrew Strauss and Kevin Pietersen in the first over. Jonathan Trott and Ravi Bopara put on a partnership worth 99 runs, but England finished all out for 171, with four overs still remaining. In reply, South Africa reached 124 with the loss of just three wickets, but then lost the next four wickets inside five overs for three runs. Stuart Broad took the final two wickets, to give England victory by six runs.

Bangladesh's score was at one point 169/8 but tail ender 58 run partnership brought victory for the team. Bangladesh's win in this match was only their second against England in a total of 15 ODIs.

Their final group match was against the West Indies, and England had to win the game to have any realistic chance of going through to the quarter finals. England chose to bat, and started quickly thanks to Jonathan Trott, who scored 47; they were 94/2 from 15 overs. However, they crumbled in the middle overs, and ended up being bowled out for 243. In reply, Chris Gayle started quickly, including 18 off a Chris Tremlett over, before being dismissed in the seventh over. The West Indies were reduced to 150-6, before a seventh-wicket partnership of 72 between Ramnaresh Sarwan and Andre Russell helped the West Indies reach 222-6 at the end of the 42nd over. However Tredwell and Swann took 3 wickets, and Trott ran out Sulieman Benn, as the West Indies were all out for 225.

In the quarter-final, Tillakaratne Dilshan and Upul Tharanga both made centuries as Sri Lanka chased down a target of 230 to win by ten wickets; this run chase set a new record for the highest successful run chase in a ten-wicket victory in ODI history.

Scorecards

Squad 

 Andrew Strauss
 James Anderson
 Ian Bell
 Tim Bresnan
 Stuart Broad
 Paul Collingwood
 Eoin Morgan
 Kevin Pietersen
 Matt Prior (wk)
 Ajmal Shahzad
 Graeme Swann
 James Tredwell
 Jonathan Trott
 Luke Wright
 Michael Yardy

Source:
Notes: 
 Morgan pulled out of the squad with a fractured finger, and was replaced by Ravi Bopara. He later rejoined the squad, replacing Kevin Pietersen, who was ruled out with a hernia midway through the initial group stage.
 Chris Tremlett replaced Stuart Broad, who was ruled out with a side injury midway through the initial group stage.
 Jade Dernbach replaced Ajmal Shahzad, who was ruled out with a hamstring strain midway through the initial group stage.
 Adil Rashid replaced Michael Yardy who was ruled out before England's quarter-final match with Sri Lanka after suffering from depression.

2015 World Cup

England failed to beat any Test-playing nations at the 2015 Cricket World Cup. Although they beat Associate nations Scotland and Afghanistan, this was not enough to qualify for the Knockout Stage. This was the third time that they had not progressed from the Group Stage.

England's fixtures began with 2 games against co-hosts Australia and New Zealand- they lost both. They reduced Australia to 52/2, and 70/3 in the 11th over. Stand-in captain George Bailey and Aaron Finch then put together a 146 run-partnership in 26 overs, and Australia accelerated their scoring rate with Glenn Maxwell, Mitchell Marsh and Brad Haddin. Despite a hat-trick from Steven Finn with the last three balls of the innings, Australia finished at 342/9. In reply, England were reduced to 92/6. Despite a 92-run partnership between James Taylor and Chris Woakes, England found themselves at 195/9. They eventually reached 231, before James Anderson was incorrectly given run out; Taylor finished on 98*, and England lost by 111 runs.

England's next match was against the other co-hosts, New Zealand. After electing to bat first, England were bowled out for 123 in the 34th over, having lost their last seven wickets for 19 runs in eight overs. New Zealand fast bowler Tim Southee picked up 7/33 in his 9 overs, which was the third-best haul in World Cup history. In reply, New Zealand captain Brendon McCullum scored the fastest World Cup fifty reaching the landmark in just 18 balls, 
and New Zealand were 105/0 after 7 overs. McCullum was dismissed off the first ball of the eighth over for 77, and the other opener, Martin Guptill also fell to the bowling of Chris Woakes in the tenth over. New Zealand consolidated the innings following this and went on to win the game by 8 wickets with more than 37 overs to spare.

After 2 heavy defeats, England looked to bounce back against Scotland, who were the lowest ranked team in the Group, and had never beaten England in an ODI. Batting first, Moeen Ali and Ian Bell put on an opening partnership of 172. However, in the first 3 overs of the batting powerplay England lost 3 wickets for 2 runs, including top-scorer Moeen Ali, and despite a 49 run partnership between Eoin Morgan and James Taylor and a 45 run partnership between Morgan and Jos Buttler, England only reached 309/8, with just 131 runs scored in the last 20 overs. In reply, Scotland started confidently with Kyle Coetzer (71) sharing an early 60 run partnership with Preston Mommsen. However, after Mommsen's dismissal, Scotland continued to lose wickets throughout the innings, including Steven Finn dismissing Coetzer for 71. Eventually, they lost their last 7 wickets for 70 runs, with 6 batsmen scoring fewer than 10 runs, as Scotland were bowled out for 184, and England won by 119 runs.

England's match against Sri Lanka was the chance to get a first win against a Test-playing nation in the tournament. However, from 62/0, their innings was reduced to 101/3 in the 21st over. Joe Root and Morgan added 60 runs for the fourth wicket before the dismissal of Morgan. The fifth-wicket partnership between Root and James Taylor yielded 98 runs in 11 overs. Taylor fell for 25, following which Root was also dismissed for a 108-ball 121. England were 265/6 in the 47th over, before Jos Buttler struck an unbeaten 39 in 19 balls to take the total to 309/6 at the end of 50 overs. Sri Lankan innings began with Lahiru Thirimanne being dropped on 3. His opening partner Tillakaratne Dilshan was out for 44 immediately after their partnership had reached 100 runs. Kumar Sangakkara joined Thirimanne and the left-hand duo punished the England bowlers with each of the batsmen making hundreds. Thirimanne struck a six off the third ball of the 48th over to complete an emphatic 9-wicket victory.

With just 1 win in 4 matches, England entered this match knowing that they had to win in order to avoid being eliminated. After being put into bat, Bangladesh were 8/2, and later 99/4. However, a 141-run partnership between Mahmudullah Riyad and Mushfiqur Rahim (the highest partnership for Bangladesh in a World Cup match) helped Bangladesh reach 275/7, their highest score against England in ODI cricket. Mahmudullah Riyad became the first player to score a century for Bangladesh in a World Cup match. England started well, reaching 97/1, including a 54-run partnership between Ian Bell and Alex Hales. However, England then collapsed to 132/5 10 overs later, with the collapse led by Bangladesh captain Mashrafe Mortaza. When Joe Root was caught behind, England needed 113 to win from 14 overs. Jos Buttler and Chris Woakes put on 75 runs for the seventh wicket, but Buttler fell for 65, and England were ultimately bowled out for 260.

In their last game, England beat Afghanistan in a rain-affected match.

Scorecards

Squad 

 Eoin Morgan (c)
 Moeen Ali
 James Anderson
 Gary Ballance
 Ian Bell
 Ravi Bopara
 Stuart Broad
 Jos Buttler (wk)
 Steven Finn
 Alex Hales
 Chris Jordan
 Joe Root
 James Taylor
 James Tredwell
 Chris Woakes

Source:

2019 World Cup

England and Wales hosted the 2019 edition of the World Cup, making it the fifth time the tournament has been held within the country. England entered the tournament as favourites, having been ranked the number one ODI side by the ICC for over a year prior to the tournament.

England began their campaign on 30 May in the opening match of the tournament against South Africa at The Oval. England batted first and, despite losing opener Jonny Bairstow for a golden duck to the second ball of the tournament, went on to score 311/8, with Ben Stokes top-scoring with 89 runs. In reply, South Africa were bowled out for 207, which included a collapse of eight wickets for 78 runs, to give England victory by 104 runs.

The next match saw the hosts suffer a shock defeat to Pakistan at Trent Bridge. After England won the toss and elected to field, Pakistan scored 348/8, with Mohammad Hafeez making 84. England managed a score of 334/9, losing by 14 runs despite centuries from both Joe Root (107) and Jos Buttler (103) with a substantial 130-run partnership for the fourth wicket.

Against Bangladesh at Sophia Gardens, England were put in to bat and made a total of 386/6, Jason Roy scoring 153 from 121 deliveries. Bangladesh were subsequently all out for 280 after Shakib Al Hasan scored 121, England winning by 106 runs.

England next travelled to Hampshire to face the West Indies at the Hampshire Bowl. England were able to restrict the West Indies to 212 after winning the toss and choosing to field, with Mark Wood taking figures of 3/18. An unbeaten hundred from Joe Root took England to a comfortable eight-wicket win with over 16 overs remaining.

Against Afghanistan at Old Trafford, England set a target of 397/6, their highest ever World Cup total. Eoin Morgan scored 148 runs from 78 balls, including 17 sixes, a record for an individual innings in an ODI. England also surpassed their own record for the most sixes by a team in an ODI, with 25. In Afghanistan's innings, they could only manage 247/8, handing England a comfortable victory by 150 runs.

Bowling first in their next match against Sri Lanka at Headingley, England required a total of 233 runs to win after Sri Lanka finished their innings with 232/9, Angelo Mathews scoring an unbeaten 85. However, England struggled against Lasith Malinga as they were bowled out for 212 in reply, Malinga taking 4/43 as England suffered another shock defeat by 20 runs. Ben Stokes provided England with some hope of a victory, finishing on 82 not out.

Scorecards

Squad

 Eoin Morgan (c)
 Moeen Ali
 Jofra Archer
 Jonny Bairstow
 Jos Buttler (wk)
 Tom Curran
 Liam Dawson
 Liam Plunkett
 Adil Rashid
 Joe Root
 Jason Roy
 Ben Stokes
 James Vince
 Chris Woakes
 Mark Wood

England World Cup statistics

World Cup record (by opponent)

Highest innings totals

Lowest completed innings

Highest individual innings

Best bowling figures

Most matches

See also
England national cricket team
Cricket in England

Notes

References

England in international cricket
History of the Cricket World Cup